Norwood District High School is located at 44 Elm Street in Norwood, Ontario, Canada.  As of 2020 it has 21 teachers.  It is a member of the Kawartha Pine Ridge District School Board.

Notable alumni
 International rock-stars Adam Gontier, Neil Sanderson, Brad Walst and Matt Walst of the band Three Days Grace

Football
Football is NDHS’ top extra-curricular draw, with the school team contending for championship titles annually. The Knights play at the upper level field, with seating expandable to 1,000 people.

See also
List of high schools in Ontario

References

External links
 Norwood District High School

High schools in Peterborough County
Educational institutions in Canada with year of establishment missing